Alan J. Levi is an American film, television director, television producer and writer.

Career
Working in television since the 1960s, Levi has amassed a number of notable credits, beginning his career as a writer on the television series National Velvet. He eventually made his directorial debut on the Rowan & Martin's Laugh-In spin-off Letters to Laugh-In.

His notable television credits include Columbo, The Invisible Man, Gemini Man, The Six Million Dollar Man, The Bionic Woman, Battlestar Galactica, The Incredible Hulk, Simon & Simon, Airwolf, Miami Vice, Magnum, P.I., Quantum Leap, Lois & Clark: The New Adventures of Superman, Dr. Quinn, Medicine Woman, JAG, ER, NCIS and NCIS: Los Angeles.

In 1982, Levi co-directed the feature film Blood Song, He also directed a number of television films.

Personal life
In 1989, Levi married actress Sondra Currie.

Filmography

Film
The Last Song (1980)
Blood Song (1982)
The Invisible Woman (1983)
The Stepford Children (1987)

Television
The Invisible Man (1975-1976)
Gemini Man (1976)
Judgment Day (1981)

References

External links

Alan Levi: From Columbo to E.R. and Beyond

American film directors
American television directors
American television writers
American male television writers
Living people
People from St. Louis
Year of birth missing (living people)
Television producers from Missouri